The Jackal is a 1997 American action thriller film directed by Michael Caton-Jones, and starring Bruce Willis, Richard Gere, and Sidney Poitier in his final film role. The film involves the hunt for a paid assassin. It is a loose remake of the 1973 film The Day of the Jackal, which starred Edward Fox, and was based on the 1971 novel of the same name by Frederick Forsyth. Although the film earned mostly negative reviews from critics, it was a commercial success and grossed $159.3 million worldwide against a $60 million budget.

Plot
A joint operation between the FBI and the MVD in Moscow leads to the killing of the younger brother of the Azerbaijani mafia leader Terek Murad. In retaliation, Murad hires an international hitman, operating under the codename "the Jackal", to assassinate an unidentified prominent American for $70 million. Two weeks later, the MVD capture and interrogate one of Murad's henchmen, Viktor Politovsky in Porvoo, Finland, and discover the assassination plot. The interrogation, coupled with recovered documents, leads the FBI and MVD to suspect that FBI Director Donald Brown is the intended target.

Using a series of disguises and stolen IDs, the Jackal prepares for the assassination attempt. FBI Deputy Director Carter Preston and Russian Police Major Valentina Koslova turn to imprisoned IRA sniper Declan Mulqueen for help. They believe that his former lover, a former ETA militant and fugitive named Isabella Zancona, can identify the Jackal. Mulqueen reveals that he knows the Jackal and agrees to help in exchange for his release as well as U.S. citizenship and safe haven for Zancona. Mulqueen and Zancona want revenge on the Jackal after he wounded her in Libya and caused her to miscarry their unborn child. Zancona, now married, provides information to help identify the Jackal, including that he is a United States Army Special Forces veteran with combat experience from his stationing in El Salvador. Zancona discreetly slips Mulqueen a key to a drop box containing a clean passport and $10,000 cash to return to Ireland. However, Mulqueen has given Preston his word that he will not run.

Meanwhile, when the Jackal arrives in Montreal to collect a large caliber weapon, a contact notifies him that hijackers are pursuing it. The Jackal kills one hijacker and evades the others. He then hires a small-time hood/gunsmith, Ian Lamont, to build a control mount for the weapon. The Jackal demands that all design specs be turned over to him, and he also demands Lamont's complete confidentiality. When Lamont tries extorting more money from the Jackal, the Jackal kills him during a live-fire test of the weapon. The FBI discovers Lamont's remains and evidence that the Jackal intends to utilize a long-range heavy machine gun for the assassination. The Jackal sails across the Great Lakes to Chicago, where he escapes the FBI and nearly kills Mulqueen. Mulqueen deduces there is a mole tipping off the Jackal. They discover that the director of the Russian Embassy in Washington DC gave the Jackal a direct access code to FBI records, allowing him to kill Koslova and Agents Witherspoon and McMurphy. Before dying, Koslova - passing on a taunt from the Jackal - tells Mulqueen that '[Declan] cannot protect his women'.

As the Jackal drives to Washington, D.C., Mulqueen deduces from the Jackal's mocking statement that his target is actually the First Lady of the United States, who is scheduled to give a public speech. The Jackal, masquerading as a gay man, dates Douglas, a man he encountered earlier in a bar; unbeknownst to Douglas, he uses Douglas's garage to store his machine gun. When a news report exposes the Jackal's identity, he kills Douglas. On the date of the First Lady's speech, the weapon is hidden in a minivan parked near the speaker podium - the Jackal plans to shoot the First Lady via remote control. However, before the Jackal can act, Mulqueen uses a sniper rifle to destroy the weapon's scope. The Jackal blindly opens fire, and Preston takes a bullet that is fired at the First Lady. Following a chase through the Washington Metro tunnels, Zancona shoots the Jackal; however, the Jackal's gun discharges a shot, and Mulqueen is hit. While Zancona consoles Mulqueen, the Jackal, who was merely wounded, pulls another backup gun. Seeing this, Mulqueen grabs Zancona's pistol and shoots the Jackal several times, finally killing him.

A few days later, Preston and Mulqueen witness the Jackal's burial in an unmarked grave. Preston reveals that he is returning to Russia to pursue Murad. He says that Mulqueen's request to be released was denied, but that he will likely be moved to a minimum security prison. Preston's heroics in saving the First Lady have enhanced his clout within the FBI. He turns his back on Mulqueen, allowing him to go free.

Cast

Production
The film began in production development from August 19 to November 30, 1996. It was filmed in international locations such as Porvoo, Finland, including its special effects. The film began production titled The Day of the Jackal, but the author of the original novel Frederick Forsyth and the director and producer of the original film Fred Zinnemann and John Woolf opposed the production. They eventually filed an injunction to prevent Universal Pictures from using the name of the original novel and film, and it would be marketed as being "inspired by" rather than directly based on Forsyth's novel. Edward Fox also refused to make a cameo appearance in the film for similar reasons.

Chuck Pfarrer had written the first script to fulfill contractual obligations to the studio, then Kevin Jarre did a rewrite to Pfarrer's script, contributing the backstory and character of the Richard Gere character.

An early test-screened version of the film had an innocent man shot by Willis' character hiding out in a gay bar. The audience loudly cheered the killing, which came to the attention of GLAAD. Chaz Bono (the group’s entertainment media director) spoke with Jackal producer Sean Daniel, who arranged to have the scene re-edited. Bruce Willis successfully fought to keep a same-sex kiss in the film.

Reception

Critical response
The Jackal received a 24% rating on Rotten Tomatoes based on 33 reviews, with an average rating of 4.6/10. The website's critical consensus reads, "The Jackal is a relatively simple chase thriller incapable of adding thrills or excitement as the plot chugs along." Metacritic gave the film a score of 36 out of 100 based on 20 reviews. Audiences polled by CinemaScore gave the film an average grade of "B−" on an A+ to F scale.

Roger Ebert of the Chicago Sun-Times called it a "glum, curiously flat thriller"; he also included the film in his "Worst of 1997", comparing it to the 1973 film and calling it a "retread", "cruder", and "dumbed down".
Ruthe Stein of the San Francisco Chronicle called it "more preposterous than thrilling"; and Russell Smith of the Austin Chronicle called it "1997's most tedious movie".

At the 1997 Stinkers Bad Movie Awards, Richard Gere received a nomination for Worst Fake Accent, but he lost to Jon Voight for Anaconda and Most Wanted.

Box office
The Jackal was released on November 14, 1997, with an opening weekend totaling $15,164,595. It went on to gross $159,330,280 worldwide, against a $60 million budget.

Music

The original score for The Jackal was composed by Carter Burwell. It was never officially released on CD, although Burwell uploaded select cues from the film to his website. The project was not a happy experience for Burwell; he disliked the script, and disapproved of producer Danny Saber's remix of his score.

See also

 The Assignment (1997 film)

References

External links

 
 

1997 films
1997 action thriller films
1990s English-language films
1990s political thriller films
1990s Russian-language films
Action film remakes
American action thriller films
American political thriller films
American remakes of British films
American remakes of French films
Films about assassinations
Films about contract killing in the United States
Films about the Federal Bureau of Investigation
Films about the Irish Republican Army
Films about the Russian Mafia
Films about terrorism in the United States
Films about The Troubles (Northern Ireland)
Films based on adaptations
Films based on British novels
Films based on works by Frederick Forsyth
Films directed by Michael Caton-Jones
Films produced by James Jacks
Films scored by Carter Burwell
Films set in Chicago
Films set in Finland
Films set in Montreal
Films set in Moscow
Films set in Washington, D.C.
Films shot at Pinewood Studios
Films shot in Finland
Gay-related films
LGBT-related film remakes
LGBT-related political films
Mutual Film Company films
Political film remakes
Techno-thriller films
Thriller film remakes
Universal Pictures films
1990s American films